Antti the Treebranch is a 1976 Finnish drama film directed by Katariina Lahti, Heikki Partanen and Riitta Rautoma. It was entered into the 10th Moscow International Film Festival.

Cast
 Markku Blomqvist as Markki Bohattov
 Pertti Hilkamo as Antti Puuhaara
 Maritta Viitamäki as Darja Bohattov
 Eero Melasniemi as Arto Mustahattu
 Matti Ruohola as Tragedian
 Matti Pellonpää as Comedian
 Margit Lindeman as Savina Iivena
 Asko Koukkari as Vilpas
 Eila Rinne as Louhi
 Mariaana Fieandt as Tuonentytti
 Leo Pentti as Hunter
 Arvi Moilanen as Teppana Partanen

References

External links
 

1976 films
1976 drama films
Finnish drama films
1970s Finnish-language films